The Geely Xingyue (meaning "star cross") is a compact crossover SUV with a sloping rear roofline produced by Geely. It is known in overseas markets as the Geely Tugella.

Overview 

The new vehicle was named "FY11" under development, and was released in March 2019 as the Xingyue. The Xingyue is based on the CMA platform.

Transmissions include a 7-speed dual-clutch transmission on lower-end models, and a 8-speed Aisin automatic transmission on the highest-spec model, the 350T.

Model variations 
All model versions are named for their produced torque, in newton-meters.

300T- The base model, a gas-only, 5-seat SUV, is powered by a 1.5TD, 3-cylinder, turbocharged direct injection engine. The transmission is a 7-speed wet dual clutch. 

350T- A power-focused sports model, similar to the 300T, but with a 2.0T 4-cylinder turbocharged engine that produces . More power comes through in the form of an Aisin 8-speed transmission.

400T- Geely's flagship Xing Yue model, and the only one with the ability to run off of pure electricity, albeit for a very limited . Despite the lowest top speed of any Xing Yue (a claimed ), it produces a modest .

Sales

References

External links

 Official website (China)

Xingyue
Cars introduced in 2019
2020s cars
Compact sport utility vehicles
Crossover sport utility vehicles
Front-wheel-drive vehicles
All-wheel-drive vehicles
Hybrid electric cars
Plug-in hybrid vehicles
Partial zero-emissions vehicles
Cars of China